Thonnalloor is in Pandalam municipal town, Kerala, India.

Places of Worship
Pattupurakkavu Bhagavathi Temple
India Pentecostal Church of God
Assemblies of God in India

References

Villages in Pathanamthitta district